Krzemieniewo may refer to the following places in Poland:
Krzemieniewo, Greater Poland Voivodeship (west-central Poland)
Krzemieniewo, Pomeranian Voivodeship (north Poland)
Krzemieniewo, Warmian-Masurian Voivodeship (north Poland)